Postcards from Leningrad, Spanish title: Postales de Leningrado) is a 2007 Venezuelan film, written and directed by Mariana Rondón. It is a drama about children growing up among guerrilla groups in the 1960s in Venezuela. It was Venezuela's official entry for the Best Foreign Language Film of the 80th Academy Awards.

Plot
During the leftist uprising in the 1960s in Venezuela, a young guerrilla-girl, living in secrecy, gives birth to her first daughter during Mother's Day. Due to that, her photos appear on the newspaper, since that moment they would have to run away.

Hidden places, false disguises and names are the daily life of The Girl, the narrator of the story. Alongside her cousin (Teo), they re-live the adventures of their guerrilla parents, building up a labyrinth with superheroes and strategies, in which nobody knows where the reality (or madness) begins. However, this children's game does not hide the deaths, tortures, denunciations and treason within the guerrillas.

The kids want to convert themselves into The Invisible Man, in order to escape from the danger. However, they know that their parents might never comeback and therefore, they'll only receive Postcards from Leningrad.

Cast
 Laureano Olivares as Teo
 Greisy Mena as Marcela/Clara/Mercedes
 William Cifuentes as Teo (Child)
 Haydee Faverola as Grandmother
 María Fernanda Ferro as Marta
 Ignacio Marquez as Tio Miguel
 Oswaldo Hidalgo as Grandfather
 Claudia Usubillaga as The Girl

Awards and honors
Best Director (Rajatha Chakoram) at International Film Festival of Kerala(IFFK), 2008
Golden Sun Award at Biarritz International Festival of Latin American Cinema, 2007
Golden India Catalina Award for best film at Cartagena Film Festival, 2008
Feature Film Trophy for best film at Cine Ceara National Cinema Festival, 2008
International Jury Award (Revelation Category) at São Paulo International Film Festival, 2007

References

External links
Postcards from Leningrad - Official site. (in Spanish)
 (in Spanish)
 

2007 films
Venezuelan drama films
2000s Spanish-language films